Sagra femorata is a species of beetle belonging to the family Chrysomelidae.

Description
These beetles have a striking sexual dimorphism. The males are much larger and have very long and strong hind legs resembling that of frogs (hence the common name). This remarkable morphology helps the males to dominate the opponents during the breeding. The basic color is quite variable, but usually it is metallic blue-green.

Distribution
This species can be found in the forests of Cambodia, China, India, Java, Laos, Myanmar, Sri Lanka, Thailand and Vietnam.

References

Chrysomelidae
Beetles described in 1773
Taxa named by Dru Drury